Rakan Yousif Humoud Al-Nisf (Arabic: راكان النصف) (born 1980) is a politician, who is an elected Member of Parliament of the Kuwait Parliament. Al-Nisf was first elected in the Kuwaiti General Election 2013, he won the third chair in the second constituency by 2,527 votes. Al-Nisf was also elected in the Kuwaiti General Election 2016 and he won the eighth chair in the second constituency by 1,888 votes.

Al-Nisf contributed in the following parliamentary committees:
 Committee of the Draft Answer to the Emiri Speech
 Financial and Economic Affairs Committee
 Public Facilities Committee

References

External links 
 Official website

1980 births
Living people
Members of the National Assembly (Kuwait)
Kuwait University alumni